The Embassy of Liberia in London is the diplomatic mission of Liberia in the United Kingdom. It is currently located next to the embassies of Mozambique and Croatia on Fitzroy Square.

Until 1986 the Embassy of Liberia was located at 21 Prince's Gate, and from 1986 until the 2000s at 2 Pembridge Place in Notting Hill.

Liberia is currently represented in the UK by HE Gurly T. Gibson-Schwarz.

Gallery

References

External links
Official site

Liberia
Diplomatic missions of Liberia
Liberia–United Kingdom relations
Buildings and structures in the City of Westminster
Fitzrovia